The Phantom Moves is the third full-length release by Canadian rock band Alert the Medic. The album was produced, recorded and mixed by Mike Turner (musician). The Phantom Moves was recorded in Toronto, Canada at The Pocket Studios in February and March 2014 and was mastered by Harry Hess at H-Bomb Mastering in Toronto. It was released independently on May 3, 2014.

The lead-off single Echo And Fade peaked at #20 on the Canadian Active Rock charts  and was used for the Plays of the Year at the 2014 NHL Awards.

Track listing
 "(Waiting In The Wings)" - 2:02
 "Cut, Copy, Paste" - 4:20
 "Hanna And The Ocean" - 2:59
 "This Is Our Time" - 3:52
 "Delicate Love" - 3:34
 "Hands That Held Me Back" - 4:07
 "All Better Now" - 2:34
 "Echo And Fade" - 3:43
 "Wonderful" - 3:03
 "We Are The Ones To Blame" - 4:34
 "Loup-Garou" - 3:04
 "Grace, Come Back" - 4:24
 "Lady In The Water" - 4:33

Personnel
 Ryan MacDonald - Vocals, guitar, keyboard
 Matt Campbell - Bass guitar, vocals
 Dale Wilson - Drums, percussion, vocals
 Troy Arseneault - Guitar, vocals

with
 Derek Giberson - Keyboard on Tracks 4, 6, 10, 13

Art
 David Collier - Artwork
 Mike MacDougall - Digital Layout

References

2014 albums
Alert the Medic albums